Robert John Carrington, 2nd Baron Carrington,  (16 January 1796 – 17 March 1868), was a politician and a baron in the Peerage of Great Britain.  He was the son of Robert Smith, 1st Baron Carrington, and Anne Boldero-Barnard. He adopted the name "Carrington" in 1839.

Politics
Still named Smith, he served as a Member of Parliament for Wendover from 1818. He had succeeded his first cousin Abel Smith on the seat, and served together with his uncle, George Smith. He was succeeded by another of his uncles, Samuel Smith, the father of his predecessor, in 1820.

He was then elected MP for Buckinghamshire, succeeding William Selby Lowndes, and serving with the Marquess of Chandos. He was succeeded by John Smith, another uncle, in 1831.

The same year, he was elected MP for Wycombe, succeeding Sir John Dashwood-King, 4th Bt, and serving with, in turn, Sir Thomas Baring, 2nd Bt (until 1832), Charles Grey (1832–1837) and George Dashwood, later 5th Bt (from 1837) – the latter being the son of Smith's predecessor on the seat. After his father's death in 1838, and on his inheritance of the barony, he was succeeded on the Wycombe seat by his first cousin, George Robert Smith. He was elected to the Royal Society as a Fellow in 1839. Later that year he adopted the name Carrington by Royal Licence.

He held the honorary title of Lord Lieutenant of Buckinghamshire from 1838 until his death in 1868.

Family

He married twice, firstly, in 1822, the Hon. Elizabeth Katherine Weld-Forester (1803–1832), daughter of Cecil Weld-Forester, 1st Baron Forester, and Lady Katherine Mary Manners. They had one daughter. After the death of his first wife (from cholera), he married, secondly, in 1840, the Hon. Charlotte Augusta Annabella Drummond-Willoughby (1815–1879), daughter of Peter Drummond-Burrell, 22nd Baron Willoughby de Eresby, and Lady Sarah Clementina Drummond. They had three sons and two daughters.

Issue

Other descendants
Among Carrington's descendants through his first daughter Cecile were his grandson Admiral Sir Stanley Colville and his great-grandson Sir John "Jock" Colville (nephew of the Admiral), civil servant and diarist. Harry Legge-Bourke, MP for Isle of Ely 1945–1973, was his great-grandson through his first son Charles.

Another great-grandson, through Carrington's third son Rupert, was Peter Carington, 6th Baron Carrington, a Conservative politician who served as Foreign Secretary in the Cabinet of Margaret Thatcher from 1979 to 1982. Lord Carrington was also a descendant in the Colville line; his father, the 5th Baron, married the Hon. Sybil Marion Colville, daughter of the 2nd Viscount Colville of Culross (Admiral Colville's elder brother).

Ancestry

References

External links 
 

1796 births
1868 deaths
People from Buckinghamshire
Lord-Lieutenants of Buckinghamshire
Members of the Parliament of the United Kingdom for English constituencies
UK MPs 1818–1820
UK MPs 1820–1826
UK MPs 1826–1830
UK MPs 1830–1831
UK MPs 1831–1832
UK MPs 1832–1835
UK MPs 1835–1837
UK MPs 1837–1841
UK MPs who inherited peerages
Fellows of the Royal Society
Robert
Robert 2